Marie Louise Island Airport  is an airstrip serving Marie Louise Island in the Seychelles. The runway is along the eastern shore of the island.

See also

Transport in Seychelles
List of airports in Seychelles

References

External links
OpenStreetMap - Marie Louise
OurAirports - Marie Louise
FallingRain - Marie Louise Airport

Airports in Seychelles